Raja Toumi (born 3 April 1978) is a Tunisian handball player. She is coaching for Orkanger IF and previously for the Tunisian national team.

She was captain for the Tunisian team at the 2009 World Women's Handball Championship in China, where Tunisia placed 14th.

References

1978 births
Living people
Sportspeople from Tunis
Tunisian female handball players
Expatriate handball players